The 53rd Wisconsin Infantry Regiment was a volunteer infantry regiment that served in the Union Army near the end of the American Civil War.

Service 
The regiment was organized at Madison, Wisconsin, and mustered in during April, 1865. Right away it was ordered to St. Louis, Missouri. After St. Louis, it then went to Fort Leavenworth, Kansas. On June 10th, 1865, the regiment was absorbed into the 51st Wisconsin Infantry Regiment. During its service the regiment lost eight men to disease.

Notable people
 Denis J. F. Murphy was 1st lieutenant of Co. D.  He previously served as a sergeant in the 14th Wisconsin Infantry Regiment, where he had earned a Medal of Honor for his actions at the Second Battle of Corinth, and was wounded five times.

See also

 List of Wisconsin Civil War units
 Wisconsin in the American Civil War

References

References
 Dyer, Frederick H. (1959). A Compendium of the War of the Rebellion. New York and London. Thomas Yoseloff, Publisher. .

Military units and formations established in 1865
Military units and formations disestablished in 1865
Units and formations of the Union Army from Wisconsin
1865 establishments in Wisconsin